Major-General Michael Denman Gambier-Parry  (21 August 1891 – 30 April 1976) was a senior British Army officer who briefly commanded the 2nd Armoured Division during the Western Desert campaign of the Second World War.

Early life and family
The Gambier-Parrys of Highnam Court, Gloucestershire were an artistic and military family (see Thomas Gambier Parry and the latter's son, eminent composer Sir Hubert Parry). His uncle Ernest Gambier-Parry was a major in the army sent to Egypt to avenge the death of General Gordon and wrote a book (Suakin, 1885) about his experiences. Michael's father was architect Sidney Gambier-Parry.

Military career

Educated at Eton College, Gambier-Parry entered the Royal Military College, Sandhurst and was commissioned into the Royal Welch Fusiliers in March 1911. He served in the First World War in France (awarded the Military Cross in 1916) and in the Gallipoli campaign and then in the Mesopotamia campaign.

After returning to Sandhurst and being placed in command of a Company of Gentleman Cadets, he attended the Staff College, Camberley from 1923 to 1924 and transferred to the Royal Tank Corps in 1924. He then served as a General Staff Officer at the War Office before becoming Commander of the Malaya Infantry Brigade in 1938.

He served in the Second World War as Head of the British Military Mission to Greece in 1940, during the Greco-Italian War and then as General Officer Commanding 2nd Armoured Division in North Africa before becoming a Prisoner of war in 1941.

He was captured by the Italians along with Brigadier E. W. D. Vaughan at Mechili in April 1941. Arriving in Villa Orsini near Sulmona with Philip Neame, Richard O'Connor, John Combe and George Younghusband, he was sent to Castello de Vincigliata PG12 near Florence the same year. As Carton de Wiart wrote of him "…he was also a most gifted man, made delightful sketches, was a first class 'forger' – which could no doubt earn him a steady income in the underworld". Known as 'GP', he was a knowledgeable musician "and led the choir in our church services on Sunday". In September 1943 he escaped with the other officers and after various adventures arrived in Rome where he had obtained sanctuary in a convent, until the Allies arrived; he retired in 1944.

Postwar
In retirement he lived at the Weavers House in Castle Combe near Chippenham and House Forest Gate in Poundgate near Crowborough and became Deputy Lieutenant of Wiltshire.

References

Bibliography

External links
Generals of World War II

1891 births
1976 deaths
Gallipoli campaign
British Army major generals
British Army generals of World War II
Royal Welch Fusiliers officers
Royal Tank Regiment officers
Recipients of the Military Cross
British Army personnel of World War I
Deputy Lieutenants of Wiltshire
Graduates of the Royal Military College, Sandhurst
Graduates of the Staff College, Camberley
People educated at Eton College
World War II prisoners of war held by Italy
British World War II prisoners of war
Academics of the Royal Military College, Sandhurst
People from Chelsea, London
Military personnel from London